Multiaxis machining is a manufacturing process that involves tools that move in 4 or more directions and are used to manufacture parts out of metal or other materials by milling away excess material, by water jet cutting or by laser cutting. This type of machining was originally performed mechanically on large complex machines. These machines operated on 4, 5, 6, and even 12 axes which were controlled individually via levers that rested on cam plates. The cam plates offered the ability to control the tooling device, the table in which the part is secured, as well as rotating the tooling or part within the machine. Due to the machines size and complexity it took extensive amounts of time to set them up for production. Once computer numerically controlled machining was introduced it provided a faster, more efficient method for machining complex parts.

Typical CNC tools support translation in 3 axis; multiaxis machines also support rotation around one or multiple axis. 5-axis machines are commonly used in industry in which the workpiece is translated linearly along three axes (typically x, y, and z) and the tooling spindle is capable of rotation about an addition 2 axes.

There are now many CAM (computer aided manufacturing) software systems available to support multiaxis machining including software that can automatically convert 3-axis toolpaths into 5-axis toolpaths. Prior to the advancement of Computer Aided Manufacturing, transferring information from design to production often required extensive manual labor, generating errors and resulting in wasted time and material.

There are three main components to multiaxis machines:

 The machines physical capabilities i.e. torque, spindle speed, axis orientation/operation.
 The CNC drive system, the components that move the machine. This includes servo-motors, rapid traverse systems, ball screws, and how positioning is monitored.
 The CNC controller, this is how data is transferred/stored within machine, and input data is processed and executed.

Multiaxis machines offer several improvements over other CNC tools, at the cost of increased complexity and price of the machine:
 The amount of human labor is reduced, if the piece would otherwise have to be turned manually during the machining.
 A better surface finish can be obtained by moving the tool tangentially about the surface (as opposed to moving the workpiece around the spindle).
 More complex parts can be manufactured, particularly parts with curved holes.
 Increased tool life due to the ability to achieve optimal angles between the tool and machining surface.
 Higher quality parts. What once required multiple setups now can be executed in only a few if not one, reducing steps and decreasing the opportunity for error.

The number of axes for multiaxis machines varies from 4 to 9. Each axis of movement is implemented either by moving the table (into which the workpiece is attached), or by moving the tool. The actual configuration of axes varies, therefore machines with the same number of axes can differ in the movements that can be performed.

Applications 

Multiaxis CNC machines are used in many industries including:

 Automotive industry: Multiaxis CNC machines create engine housings, rims. and headlights.
 Furniture industry: CNC lathes mass-produce wooden table legs as well as most other components.
 Medical industry: Multiaxis CNC machines create custom hip replacements, dental implants, and prosthetic limbs.

Multiaxis machining is also commonly used for rapid prototyping as it can create strong, high quality models out of metal, plastic, and wood while still being easily programmable.

Computer-aided manufacturing (CAM) software 
CAM software automates the process of converting 3D models into tool paths, the route the multiaxis machine takes to mill a part (Fig. 1). This software takes into account the different parameters of the tool head (in the case of a CNC router, this would be the bit size), dimensions of the blank, and any constraints the machine may have. The tool paths for multiple passes can be generated to produce a higher level of detail on the parts. The first few passes remove large amounts of material, while the final, most important pass creates the surface finish. In the case of the CNC lathe, the CAM software will optimize the tool path to have the central axis of the part align with the rotary of the lathe. Once the tool paths have been generated, the CAM software will convert them into G-code, allowing the CNC machine to begin milling.

CAM software is currently the limiting factor in the capabilities of a multiaxis machine with ongoing development. Recent breakthroughs in this space include:

 Topology optimization, an algorithm that refines 3D models to be more efficient and cost-effective on CNC machines.
 Automated recognition of 3D model features, which can simplify tool path generation by identifying instructions for the machine to follow from the features of the 3D model.

See also
 Machine tool
 Milling machine
 Numerical control
 CNC pocket milling

References 

Machining
Computer-aided engineering